Murray Spence (born 30 April 1988) is a South African cricketer. He played in one Twenty20 match for Border in 2013.

See also
 List of Border representative cricketers

References

External links
 

1988 births
Living people
South African cricketers
Border cricketers
Cricketers from East London, Eastern Cape